Grundzüge der Mengenlehre (German for "Basics of Set Theory") is a book on set theory written by Felix Hausdorff.

First published in April 1914, Grundzüge der Mengenlehre was the first comprehensive introduction to set theory. Besides the systematic treatment of known results in set theory, the book also contains chapters on measure theory and topology, which were then still considered parts of set theory. Hausdorff presented and developed original material which was later to become the basis for those areas. In 1927 Hausdorff published an extensively revised second edition under the title Mengenlehre (German for "Set Theory"), with many of the topics of the first edition omitted. In 1935 there was a third German edition, which in 1957 was translated by John R. Aumann et al. into English under the title Set Theory.

The author, Felix Hausdorff, committed suicide on 26 January 1942, along with his wife and his sister-in-law, to avoid the Nazi holocaust, after being ordered to report for deportation.

Chelsea Publishing Company reprinted the book in New York City in German in 1949 and 1965, but never issued an English translation of this first edition to date.

References
.

 Reprinted by Chelsea Publishing Company in 1949 and 1965 .
 Republished by Dover Publications, New York, N. Y., 1944 
 Republished by AMS-Chelsea 2005.
. Extended edition of a chapter in The Princeton Companion to Mathematics.

1914 non-fiction books
Mathematics books